Steven Alan Hollier (born 1976), is a male former athlete who competed for England.

Athletics career
He became the British champion in 2002 and 2003 after winning the British 50 Km walk title.

He represented England in the 50Km walk event, at the 1998 Commonwealth Games in Kuala Lumpur, Malaysia. Four years later he represented England again at the 2002 Commonwealth Games.

References

1976 births
Living people
English male racewalkers
Athletes (track and field) at the 1998 Commonwealth Games
Athletes (track and field) at the 2002 Commonwealth Games
Commonwealth Games competitors for England